<noinclude>
Citrus Plaza, is a shopping center located in Redlands, California, United States, owned by Majestic Realty Co. It consists of 520,000 square feet of retail and restaurant space, anchored by Target and Kohl’s, on 53 acres of a 120-acre master planned shopping center. Citrus Plaza opened in 2004-05.

History

The "doughnut hole" is an approximately  unincorporated area surrounded by the city of Redlands in southwestern San Bernardino County, California. Citrus groves and farmland were scattered throughout the area since the 19th century.

The city of Redlands began making public works improvements in the 1970s, after the county's Local Agency Formation Commission indicated the city would eventually be allowed to annex the area. Majestic Realty acquired the majority of the land and proposed the Citrus Plaza shopping center in 1993. Negotiations with the city government through the 1990s deteriorated into legal disputes. Majestic Realty successfully lobbied the state government to pass a law in 2000 removing Redlands' control over the area. Local governments and Majestic Realty came to a settlement in 2000, and the center opened in 2003.

In 2003, voters in Redlands passed Measure N, a tax-sharing agreement that allocates 90% of sales tax generated in the Donut Hole to the city, and the remainder to the county. By 2023, the city will be receiving 100% of the sales tax revenue.

An expansion called Mountain Grove at Citrus Plaza opened in 2015.

Description 
Citrus Plaza is a 100% leased property. It is highly visible from the Foothill (210) and San Bernardino (10) freeways. It is located in the "Donut Hole", an enclave of unincorporated San Bernardino County territory within Redlands. The shopping center opened in 2003 after controversy over its location.

The shopping center comprises department stores, shops, restaurants, a movie theater and 281 residential units. Retail anchors are Kohl's, Target, Hobby Lobby, Banana Republic and Nordstrom. There are events throughout the year such as the tree lighting and Santa during the holiday season. A 110-room hotel and a grocery store are under construction and set to open in 2021. The Target has been remodoled into a Super Target.

References

External links 
 And He Is Us at the Redlands Fortnightly Club
 The Almost "Hole" Story

Shopping malls in San Bernardino County, California
Shopping malls established in 2003
2003 establishments in California